Tyndrum Lower railway station is one of two railway stations serving the small village of Tyndrum in Scotland, the other being . This station is on the Oban branch of the West Highland Line, originally part of the Callander and Oban Railway. It is sited  from Callander via Glen Ogle, between Crianlarich and Dalmally. ScotRail manage the station and operate all services.

History 

This station opened on 1 August 1873 as a terminal station. This was the first railway station in the village of Tyndrum. Until 1877, it was the western extremity of the Callander and Oban Railway.

In 1877, the Callander and Oban Railway was extended from Tyndrum to Dalmally. The old terminus then became the goods yard. The through station was originally laid out with two platforms, one on either side of a passing loop.

In 1894, the West Highland Railway opened a second station in Tyndrum, north of the village. In 1953, the suffixes "Upper" and "Lower" were added to the station names. Services to Callander &  over the old C&O route via Strathyre ceased on 27 September 1965 - they had been scheduled for withdrawal as a result of the Beeching Axe from 1 November that year, but ended five weeks prior to that date following a landslide in Glen Ogle that blocked the trackbed. All services henceforth used the 1897 connection to the WHR at Crianlarich Upper to reach Glasgow.

Facilities 
The station is equipped with a shelter, a bench, bike racks, a help point and a car park, to which there is step-free access from the platform. As there are no facilities to purchase tickets, passengers must buy one in advance, or from the guard on the train.

Passenger volume 
In the 2006-07 period, the station was apparently the least used station in Scotland, which may have been down to calculations from tickets which show "Tyndrum stations", which are valid to either here or Upper Tyndrum.

The statistics cover twelve month periods that start in April.

Services
Six trains in each direction call Mondays to Saturdays, with three departures each way on Sundays all year. There is an additional train each way in summer only, which runs from/to Edinburgh Waverley (rather than Glasgow Queen Street).

References

Bibliography

External links

Video footage of Tyndrum Lower Station

Railway stations in Stirling (council area)
Former Caledonian Railway stations
Railway stations in Great Britain opened in 1873
Railway stations served by ScotRail